The Vaccine Damage Payment is a provision of the welfare state in the United Kingdom that provides a substantial payment for people who can show that they have suffered a vaccine injury.

Description 
The Vaccine Damage Payment program was created in 1979 to provide significant payment to people who are severely disabled as a result of vaccinations against certain diseases. It is a statutory program, and it is not necessary to demonstrate negligence in order to qualify.

Between 1997 and 2005, the government of the United Kingdom paid £3.5m, in 35 payments of £100,000 each, to patients who were left disabled by vaccinations.
An FOI to The Department for Work and Pensions (DWP) was made in 2019. The DWP’s response states that up until May 2019 £74,690,000 has been paid out from the fund, and 941 claims have been successful.

Qualifications 
To qualify for the program, a person must be severely disabled as a result of a vaccination, and the disablement must be assessed as at least 60%. The state will still pay even if the vaccination was not administered by them. Additionally, a person can still qualify if a vaccine against one of the diseases listed below was administered to the claimant's mother while the mother was pregnant. The claimant may also qualify if they have been in close physical contact with someone who had an oral vaccine against poliomyelitis.

The vaccination must have been for one of the following diseases: 
    diphtheria
    tetanus
    pertussis (whooping cough)
    poliomyelitis
    measles
    mumps
    rubella (German measles)
    tuberculosis (TB)
    haemophilus influenzae type B (HIB)
    meningococcal group C (meningitis C)
    pneumococcal infection
    human papillomavirus
    pandemic influenza A (H1N1) 2009 (swine flu) - up to 31 August 2010
    smallpox - up to 1 August 1971
Coronavirus (COVID-19)

The vaccination must also have been administered before the claimant's 18th birthday, unless the vaccination was administered during an outbreak of disease in the United Kingdom or the Isle of Man, or if it was a vaccine for poliomyelitis, rubella, Meningococcal Group C, human papillomavirus, pandemic influenza A (H1N1) 2009 (swine flu) or COVID-19. The vaccination must have been administered in the United Kingdom or the Isle of Man, or as part of Armed Forces medical treatment.

In 2018, the Department of Health and Social Care conceded that the age restriction wrongly excluded adults from the program.

See also 

 National Vaccine Injury Compensation Program - the no-fault system for litigating vaccine injury claims in the USA

References

External links
 Vaccine Damage Payment—The UK government's web page on the scheme.

Social security in the United Kingdom